Épico is the debut studio album by Puerto Rican singer Lunay. Released on October 25, 2019, under the label Star Island, the album features 14 tracks, and features collaborations with urban artists such as Daddy Yankee, Bad Bunny, Ozuna, Anuel AA, Myke Towers, Wisin & Yandel, Brytiago, Lyanno, Alex Rose, Darell, Chris Jeday and Gaby Music. It was released 14 months after Lunay started his musical career.

Critical reception
Remezcla called Épico a "14-track wonder of Reggaeton, Latin trap and dancehall influences that mark a young artist who is already well on his way to mainstay status in música urbana. (Épico is certainly a manifestation, if not ambitious, in its "epic" name.)"

Track listing

Charts

Weekly charts

Year-end charts

References

2019 debut albums
Reggaeton albums
Spanish-language albums